Delportshoop is a town in  Frances Baard District Municipality in the Northern Cape Province of South Africa. It lies next to the Vaal River. The Harts River runs by closely.

Early settlement

It developed from a diamond-diggers’ camp. The public diggings were proclaimed in November 1871, a village management board was instituted in 1931, and municipal status attained in 1970.

Name

Delportshoop was originally called  “Thomas Hope”, but later the name was changed to “Delport’s Hope” . The first Prosecutor was  P.J. Marais. He farmed on Langberg in the region. Marais were told a story that the first diamond was find by a young man whose surname was Delport. The diamond diggers then changed  it to  Delport’s Hope. Later the ‘’Hope’’, became ‘’Hoop’’.

Schools

•	Delportshoop Primary School 

•	Dikgatlong Secondary School 

•	Francis Mohapanele Primary School

•	Delportshoop High School Children from Ulco, the mining community nearby attend this school

Vaalharts Irrigation Scheme

The Vaalharts Irrigation Scheme is a very large water irrigation scheme. This is run out of Delportshoop.

Tswana names

Two Tswana names for Delportshoop are encountered, namely Tsineng, also spelt Tsining, Tsening, Tsenin and Tsoneng, and Dekgathlong, also spelt Dekhath-long, Dekatlong, Dekgathlong, Dikgatlhong, Likatlong and Likhat-lhong. The latter name means ‘meeting-place’, referring to the confluence of the Vaal and Harts rivers there.

References

Populated places in the Dikgatlong Local Municipality
Populated places established in 1871
Vaal River
1871 establishments in the Cape Colony